Pat's King of Steaks (also known as Pat's Steaks) is a Philadelphia restaurant specializing in cheesesteaks, and located at the intersection of South 9th Street, Wharton Street and East Passyunk Avenue in South Philadelphia, directly across the street from rival Geno's Steaks. It was founded in 1930 by brothers Pat and Harry Olivieri, who are credited with the creation of the cheesesteak.

History
Pat's King of Steaks was founded by Pat and Harry Olivieri in 1930 when they opened a hot dog stall at the corners of 9th Street, Wharton Street, and Passyunk Avenue. The brothers are generally credited as the co-creators of the cheesesteak.

In 1933, as the family relates the story, the brothers were working their stand when they decided to try something different for lunch. Pat Olivieri sent Harry Olivieri to the market for some inexpensive steak. The brothers thinly sliced the steak, then grilled it along with some chopped onions. The aroma attracted a cabdriver who was a regular customer; he asked to try the dish which the brothers called a steak sandwich, though the term originated from Louis' Lunch in New Haven, Connecticut, describing a similar sandwich. Pat sold him the sandwich for ten cents. The steak sandwich would later evolve into the modern cheesesteak.

Soon afterwards, at the advice of the aforementioned cabdriver, the brothers started selling steak sandwiches instead of hot dogs. By 1940, they had saved enough money to rent space to open a restaurant at the same spot where they had their stand. The two brothers worked at the restaurant for 15 to 18 hours a day for the next few decades while the restaurant was open 24 hours a day. Harry worked at the Philadelphia Navy Yard during World War II before returning to the restaurant.

After pulling back from expansion and franchising efforts in the 1980s, the business was divided up by the Olivieri family. Harry and his son, Frank, kept the original location, today run by Harry's grandson, Frank Jr. Pat's son Herbert opened "Olivieri's Prince of Steaks", later to be the source of a family dispute (see below).

Description

A sign explains how to order; the customer asks for a variety of sandwich and then says "wit" or "wit-out" (i.e. 'with' or 'without' onions), a tongue-in-cheek reference to the Philadelphia accent. The varieties available are: with Cheez Whiz, provolone, or American cheese, as well as plain (no cheese).

Olivieri family feud
Pat's King of Steaks is the original shop opened by Pasquale "Pat" Olivieri and his brother, Harry. Harry's grandson, Frank, owns Pat's. Pat's grandson, Rick, owned Rick's Original Philly Steaks at Reading Terminal Market, which closed in October 2008. He subsequently opened and closed Rick's Steaks restaurants at other locations.

Pat's son, Herbert (Rick's father), expanded the business by opening franchises of Pat's King of Steaks. In the 1980s, the Olivieris split up the business. Harry and Frank Sr. kept the original location, Herbert ("King" Pat's son) opened Olivieri's Prince of Steaks in Reading Terminal Market. Herbert's son Rick renamed it "Rick's" in the mid-1990s, still using the crown logo and mentioning his grandfather, Pat Olivieri.

In October 2006, Pat's sued Rick's, alleging trademark infringement, trademark dilution, and unfair competition, based on the use of the crown logo and the name "Pat Olivieri".

The suit was settled in August 2007. Terms were not disclosed. Frank Olivieri Jr. said he was "...happy with the settlement and I'm sure my cousin Rick is, as well." Rick Olivieri told reporters, "It's an agreement we can both live with. Everybody is happy."

See also

 Italian Market
 History of Italian Americans in Philadelphia
 List of submarine sandwich restaurants

References

External links

 
 Virtual Tour

Restaurants established in 1930
Restaurants in Philadelphia
Submarine sandwich restaurants
Passyunk Square, Philadelphia
1930 establishments in Pennsylvania